is a railway station on the Keio Inokashira Line in Suginami, Tokyo, Japan, operated by the private railway operator Keio Corporation.

Lines

Service pattern
Limited-stop "Express" and all-stations "Local" services stop at this station. During the daytime, there are eight "Express" and eight "Local" services per hour in either direction.

Station layout

The station consists of a ground-level island platform serving two tracks. The station has an above-track station building, completed in 2005. The station previously had a ground-level station building at the north exit, connected by an underground passageway.

Platforms

History
The station opened on 1 August 1933.

From 22 February 2013, station numbering was introduced on Keio lines, with Kugayama Station becoming "IN14". 13 August 2018,Torrential rain flooded the escalators at Kugayama Station, rendering them unusable.

Passenger statistics
In fiscal 2011, the station was used by an average of 36,633 passengers daily.

The passenger figures for previous years are as shown below.

References

External links

 Kugayama Station information (Keio) 

Railway stations in Tokyo
Railway stations in Japan opened in 1933